Farajollah Salahshoor (‎; 3 November 1952 – 27 February 2016) was an Iranian film director. He directed several popular religious films and TV series including Prophet Joseph and The Men of Angelos (about Seven Sleepers). He had a conservative view and believed in Islamic cinema. He died of lung cancer on 27 February 2016.

Salahshoor's work was primarily focused on the Islamic tradition and the Quran. He died before completing his next film or TV series about prophet Mosa and the series remained unpublished.

Selected filmography

As director
 Ayyub-e Payambar: about Job (biblical figure)
 The Men of Angelos
 Prophet Joseph (TV series)

As actor
 The Flight in the Night

References

External links
 

Iranian film directors
1952 births
2016 deaths
People from Qazvin